Royal City Avenue or RCA is one of Bangkok's largest entertainment and clubbing areas. 
Located on in Huai Khwang district, RCA is a long street located between Rama IX Road and Phetchaburi Road. It contains a multitude of bars, nightclubs and live music venues. RCA, a government designated Entertainment Zone, is frequently visited by young people.

Notable clubs
 Route 66
 Flix
 Slim
 Hobb
 Ezze
 The Overtone Music Cave
 Nospace
 808
 Inch
 JazzIt
 Baroque Club 
 Love Boat Club
 Dude Nightclub
 T.D.C. club

Places
Among the entertainment venues there are the UMG RCA cinemas, which include the House art film cinema, as well as a go-kart racing track, a bowling alley, restaurants and a Tops supermarket. RCA is also known for the nightclubs and discothèques located there. 

Tourist attractions in Bangkok
Streets in Bangkok
Entertainment districts
Huai Khwang district